Richard Lawrence McKenzie (8 January 1883 – 13 June 1959) was an Australian politician who represented the South Australian House of Assembly seat of Murray from 1938 to 1953. Elected as an independent, he joined Labor in 1943.

He was one of 14 of 39 lower house MPs at the 1938 election to be elected as an independent, which as a grouping won 40 percent of the primary vote, more than either of the major parties. Tom Stott was the de facto leader of the independent caucus within parliament.

References

1883 births
1959 deaths
Members of the South Australian House of Assembly
Independent members of the Parliament of South Australia
Australian Labor Party members of the Parliament of South Australia
20th-century Australian politicians